The table tennis competition at the 2015 Games of the Small States of Europe took place from 2–6 June 2015 at the TBR Badminton Hall in Reykjavik.

Medal summary

Medal table

Medalists

2015 in table tennis
2015 Games of the Small States of Europe
2015